Shebe Senbo is one of the woredas in the Oromia Region of Ethiopia. It was part of Seka Chekorsa woreda. The major town is Shebe.

Demographics 
The 2007 national census reported a total population for this woreda of 112,068, of whom 56,737 were men and 55,331 were women; 5,265 or 4.7% of its population were urban dwellers. The majority of the inhabitants were Moslem, with 76.83% of the population reporting they observed this belief, while 21.26% of the population said they practised Ethiopian Orthodox Christianity, and 1.77% were Protestant.

Notes 

Districts of Oromia Region